Muscula brevifurca is a moth of the family Erebidae. It is found in Iraq.

References

Moths described in 1957
Lithosiina